Vićentije "Vićenco" Vuković (1560–71) was a printer and editor of books in Serbian in the Republic of Venice, and son of the predecessor, Božidar Vuković, and partner of Jerolim Zagurović, Jakov of Kamena Reka and Stefan Marinović. He had succeeded the noble title from his father (conte palladin), but was patriotically self-styled as Serbian Despot (Servie Despot), since the last official Serbian Despot, Pavle Bakić, had died in 1537.

His father's books were so popular that until 1561 Vićenco had only published reprints of his fathers books and successfully sold them. The reprints include Октоих петогласник reprinted in 1560, based on the 1537 edition.

In 1561 Stefan Marinović printed his first book in printing house of Vićenco Vuković. Vuković's printing press was used by Jakov of Kamena Reka in 1566 when he printed the Book of Hours. In 1571 Jakov again rented printing press of Vićenco Vuković

Annotations 
Name: Vićenco, Vićenzo, Vićentije

See also
Božidar Vuković
Božidar Goraždanin
Đurađ Crnojević
Stefan Marinović
Hieromonk Makarije
Hieromonk Mardarije
Hegumen Mardarije
Hieromonk Pahomije
Trojan Gundulić
Andrija Paltašić
Jakov of Kamena Reka
Bartolomeo Ginammi who followed Zagurović's footsteps reprinting Serbian books.
Dimitrije Ljubavić
Stefan Paštrović
Inok Sava
Jerolim Zagurović
Jovan Maleševac

References

Further reading
 
 
 

Year of birth missing
Year of death missing
16th-century printers
16th-century Serbian people
Serbian printers
Serbs of Montenegro
Republic of Venice printers
Venetian period in the history of Montenegro
Venetian Slavs
16th-century Eastern Orthodox Christians
16th-century Italian businesspeople